Sailing is an Asian Games sport since the 1970 edition and has been held at every edition since, After not being included in 1974.

Editions

Events
Legend
M — Men
O — Open
W — Women
X — Mixed

Medal table

List of medalists

References

External links 
Sports123

 
Sports at the Asian Games
Asian Games
Asian Games